Robert Edward Blake (born December 18, 1969) is a former American football offensive guard in the National Football League for the Miami Dolphins. He also was a member of the Winnipeg Blue Bombers in the Canadian Football League. He played college football at Auburn University.

Early years
Blake attended Lincoln County High School, where he played defensive tackle. His brother Ricky Blake was one of his teammates. 

He enrolled at Northwest Mississippi Community College. He played offensive tackle and was a two-time first-team J.C. Gridwire. He transferred to Auburn University after his sophomore season.

He played mostly at offensive guard, switching to defensive tackle in short-yardage situations. He was the first Auburn two-way player in 14 years. He received All-SEC honors as a senior.

Professional career
Blake was selected by the Miami Dolphins in the second round (43rd overall) of the 1992 NFL Draft. Although he was mostly an offensive lineman in college, he was drafted with the intention of converting him into a nose tackle for the Dolphins' 3-4 defense. He suffered a broken bone in his left foot by dropping a 45-pound weight in April before the NFL Draft. He was placed on the physically unable to perform list on July 19, 1992. He was waived on August 26 and placed on the injured reserve list. On November 6, he suffered a tear of his medial collateral ligament and was lost for the year.  

In 1993, he was moved back to offensive guard, to compete for the right guard starting position. He suffered a sprained knee in July, that slowed his progress. He was declared inactive in all of the games during the regular season. He was released on July 25, 1994, after the Dolphins signed free agent offensive guard Houston Hoover.

On July 28, 1994, he was signed as a free agent by the Green Bay Packers. He was released on August 9.

On November 14, 1995, he was signed by the Winnipeg Blue Bombers of the Canadian Football League. He appeared in 9 games during the 1996 season.

Personal life
His older brother Ricky Blake, played running back in the NFL and CFL.

References

External links
Eddie Blake Stats

1969 births
Living people
People from Fayetteville, Tennessee
Players of American football from Tennessee
American football defensive tackles
American football offensive guards
Northwest Mississippi Rangers football players
Auburn Tigers football players
Miami Dolphins players
Winnipeg Blue Bombers players
New York CityHawks players
New England Sea Wolves players